Njegoš Janjušević (born 5 August 1996) is a Serbian professional footballer who plays for Ukrainian club Peremoha Dnipro.

Career statistics

References

External links
 
 
 

1996 births
Living people
Association football defenders
Serbian footballers
FK Bežanija players
FK Jedinstvo Užice players
FK Polet Ljubić players
FC DAC 1904 Dunajská Streda players
FK BSK Borča players
FK Loznica players
FK Zlatibor Čajetina players
FC Peremoha Dnipro players
Serbian SuperLiga players
Serbian First League players
Serbian expatriate footballers
Serbian expatriate sportspeople in Slovakia
Expatriate footballers in Slovakia
Serbian expatriate sportspeople in Ukraine
Expatriate footballers in Ukraine
People from Prijepolje